The Hôtel des Deux-Ponts, formerly known as the Hôtel Gayot and currently as the Hôtel du gouverneur militaire, is a historic building located on Place Broglie on the Grande Île in the city center of Strasbourg, in the French department of the Bas-Rhin. It has been classified as a Monument historique since 1921.

The Hôtel des Deux-Ponts is currently used as the official residence of the military governor of Strasbourg.

History
The Hôtel was designed as a hôtel particulier for the brothers, royal moneylenders François-Marie Gayot and Félix-Anne Gayot and built in 1754-55 featuring a courtyard, two ornate façades, a grand portal and a French garden. In 1770, it was sold by François-Marie Gayot to count palatine Christian IV of Zweibrücken ( =  = ). Maximilian Joseph of Zweibrücken-Birkenfeld, the future King Maximilian I of Bavaria lived there from 1770 until 1790. His son and successor on the Bavarian throne, Ludwig I of Bavaria, was born in this palace on 25 August 1786.

The hôtel became state-owned (bien public) in the wake of the French Revolution in 1791 and has served as the official residence for military governors and chiefs of staff since, including during the periods when Strasbourg was a German town again (1871–1918 and 1940–1944). It is not open for tourists apart on special days such as European Heritage Days.

Gallery

References

External links

Hôtel du gouverneur militaire - place Broglie on archi-wiki.org

Literature
Recht, Roland; Foessel, Georges; Klein, Jean-Pierre: Connaître Strasbourg, 1988, pages 119–120

See also
Palais Rohan
Hôtel de Hanau
Hôtel de Klinglin
Hôtel du grand doyenné

18th-century architecture
Monuments historiques of Strasbourg
Government buildings completed in 1755
Hôtels particuliers in Strasbourg
1755 establishments in France
18th-century architecture in France